Lee Jang-woo (born June 1, 1986) is a South Korean actor and singer. He is best known for his roles in the television series Glory Jane, I Do, I Do,My Only One and  Homemade Love Story. Lee also became popular after being paired with Ham Eun-jung in the third season of fictional marriage reality show We Got Married.

In 2009 Lee, No Min-woo and Hyun Woo formed the K-pop project group 24/7, which has since disbanded after releasing the single 24 Hours a Day, 7 Days a Week''. Lee also appeared in a 2011 music video for his cousin, singer Hwanhee.

Filmography

Television series

Film

Television show

Music video

Theater

Discography

Awards and nominations

References

External links
 Lee Jang-woo at Hunus Entertainment 
 
 
 

South Korean male television actors
South Korean male film actors
South Korean pop singers
1986 births
Living people
Dongguk University alumni
Seokyeong University alumni
21st-century South Korean  male singers